The Tinton Falls Solar Farm is a 20-megawatt solar photovoltaic power plant located in Tinton Falls, New Jersey. The farm contains 85,000 ground-mounted solar panels, and at the time of its construction, it was one of the largest solar farms in the northeast United States.

The solar farm was developed by Rager Energy LLC and was acquired in 2011 as a fully approved project by Jiangsu Zongyi (a Chinese company) under a subsidiary named Zongyi Solar Energy (America). 
The purchase price of the raw land was reported to be $5.5 million US dollars (2012).

The solar farm began operations in October 2012.

See also

Solar power in New Jersey
List of power stations in New Jersey

References

External links
Article about the solar farm

Photovoltaic power stations in New Jersey
Energy infrastructure completed in 2012
Buildings and structures in Monmouth County, New Jersey
Tinton Falls, New Jersey